Ground Dweller is the debut full-length album by Australian post-hardcore band Hands Like Houses. It was released on 13 March 2012 through Rise Records and was produced by Cameron Mizell.

Track listing

Personnel

Hands Like Houses
Trenton Woodley – lead vocals
Matt "Coops" Cooper – lead guitar
Alex Pearson – rhythm guitar, backing vocals
Joel Tyrrell – bass guitar, backing vocals
Jamal Sabet – keyboards
Matt Parkitney – drums, percussion

Additional personnel
Tyler Carter – guest vocals on "Lion Skin"
Jonny Craig – guest vocals on "Lion Skin"
Matty Mullins – guest vocals on "Watchmaker"

Production
Cameron Mizell – production, engineer, mixing
Glenn Thomas – design
Jamal Ruhe – mastering

Charts

References 

2012 debut albums
Hands Like Houses albums
Rise Records albums
Albums produced by Cameron Mizell